"Eat Raw Meat = Blood Drool" is a song by British indie rock band Editors and features on their 2009 album, In This Light and On This Evening. It was released on 24 May 2010 as the third single from the album.

The promotional video for the song premiered on 21 April 2010.

Track listing
Promo CD
 "Eat Raw Meat = Blood Drool (Radio Edit)" – 3:38
 "Eat Raw Meat = Blood Drool (Acoustic Version)" – 3:33

German CD Maxi Single
 "Eat Raw Meat = Blood Drool (Radio Edit)" – 3:38
 "Alone" – 3:10
 "Thousands Of Lovers" – 3:17
 "Eat Raw Meat = Blood Drool (Acoustic Version)" – 3:33
 "Eat Raw Meat = Blood Drool (Magnus 'Veggie' Mix)" – 5:06
 "Eat Raw Meat = Blood Drool (Steppin Brothers Remix)" – 3:30

References

Editors (band) songs
2010 singles
Song recordings produced by Flood (producer)
2009 songs
Songs written by Chris Urbanowicz
Songs written by Edward Lay
Songs written by Russell Leetch
Songs written by Tom Smith (musician)